Kënga Magjike 2021 was the 22nd edition of the annual Albanian music competition Kënga Magjike. It was organised by Televizioni Klan (TV Klan) and consisted of two semi-finals on 26 and 27 May and the final on 29 May 2021. The three live shows were hosted by Marsela Çibukaj and Ardit Gjebrea. Alban Ramosaj with "Thikat e mia" emerged as the winner of the contest.

Format 

The 22nd edition of Kënga Magjike was organised by Televizioni Klan (TV Klan) and consisted of two semi-finals on 26 and 27 May, respectively, and the final on 29 May 2021. The three live shows were hosted by the contest's founder Ardit Gjebrea and Albanian singer Marsela Çibukaj. The participating contestants of Kënga Magjike were divided into two categories–the Big and Newcomers group–and presented their entries on the broadcaster's live programme "E Diela Shqiptare" on every Sunday from the 21 March 2021. During the broadcast, a jury panel, consisting of Arben Skënderaj, Enkel Demi, Jonida Maliqi, Kozeta Kurti and Markelian Kapedani, selected the contestants of the Newcomers group.

Contestants

Semi-finals

Semi-final 1 

The first semi-final of Kënga Magjike took place on 26 May 2021.

Semi-final 2 

The second semi-final of Kënga Magjike took place on 27 May 2021.

Final 

The grand final of Kënga Magjike took place on 29 May 2021 and was broadcast at 21:00 (CET). Before the end of the contest, Alban Ramosaj emerged as the winner with the song "Thikat e mia".

References 

2021 in Albanian music
2021 song contests
2021
May 2021 events in Europe